Breasal mac Maine Mór, 2nd king of Uí Maine, fl. 4th-century/5th-century.

John O'Donovan remarked that "Bresal, son of Maine, thirty years, when he died a natural death, which the poem states was surprising, as he had been much engaged in wars." He participated in the war that led to the foundation of Ui Maine with his father and grandfather.

References

 http://www.rootsweb.ancestry.com/~irlkik/ihm/uimaine.htm
 Annals of Ulster at CELT: Corpus of Electronic Texts at University College Cork
 Annals of Tigernach at CELT: Corpus of Electronic Texts at University College Cork
 Revised edition of McCarthy's synchronisms at Trinity College Dublin.
 Irish Kings and High-Kings, Francis John Byrne, Dublin (1971;2003) Four Courts Press, 
 History of the O'Maddens of Hy-Many, Gerard Madden, 2004. .
 The Life, Legends and Legacy of Saint Kerrill: A Fifth-Century East Galway Evangelist by Joseph Mannion, 2004. 
 http://www.ucc.ie/celt/published/G105007/index.html

People from County Galway
People from County Roscommon
5th-century Irish monarchs
Kings of Uí Maine